The Gruta do Zé Grande is a cave located in Serretinha, situated in the civil parish of Feteira, municipality of Angra do Heroísmo, in the Portuguese archipelago of the Azores.

References

Angra do Heroísmo
Gruta Ze Grande
Lava tubes